St Cyprian's Church is a parish church of the Church of England in the Marylebone district of London. The church was consecrated in 1903, but the parish was founded in 1866. It is dedicated to Cyprian, a third-century martyr and bishop of Carthage and is near the Clarence Gate Gardens entrance to Regent's Park, off Baker Street. The present church was designed by Ninian Comper and is a Grade II* listed building.

The first St Cyprian's - Mission Chapel
The parish was formed by the efforts of noted 'slum priest' Father Charles Gutch, who after curacies at St Matthias', Stoke Newington, St Paul's, Knightsbridge, and All Saints, Margaret Street wanted a church of his own in London. Gutch's campaigning Anglo Catholic views and strong pastoral mission to London's poor and dispossessed led him to propose a mission church in the deprived and dilapidated northeastern corner of Marylebone. This required a portion of the parishes of St Marylebone and St Paul, Rossmore Road to be handed over. However, neither the Rector of St Marylebone nor the Vicar of St Paul's approved of the Anglo Catholic churchmanship and pastoral stance of Gutch. 

Gutch negotiated a small portion of St Paul's parish be transferred to a new mission district where church attendance was in any case poor. The district was about one tenth the area of the parish, but it was densely populated due to the overcrowded slums that at that time occupied much of it. Gutch proposed to dedicate the mission chapel to St Cyprian of Carthage, explaining: 

Though designed by the celebrated church architect George Edmund Street, St Cyprian's mission chapel was a low-budget affair, created by converting one terraced house and a hay barn in the mews to the rear, unlike Street's more usual grand designs. The first Eucharist was celebrated on 29 March 1866. Over the next thirty years St Cyprian Mission Chapel flourished, but could only hold 180 and multiple services were needed on Sunday to accommodate demand. 1st Viscount Portman was ground landlord and refused a site for a larger replacement, as he did not like Gutch's churchmanship. Gutch died in 1896, his vision of a permanent church unrealised.

The Present Church

Bishop Mandell Creighton, appointed the Reverend George Forbes as Gutch's successor. Forbes argued for a new permanent church and in 1901 the 2nd Lord Portman, who had inherited his father's estates, agreed to sell a nearby site for £1000. This was probably below its market value and the sale was conditional on it being demonstrated that sufficient funds were available to complete the church for consecration by 1 June 1904. The sale coincided with the clearance of run-down houses in Park Street – today renamed Glentworth Sreet – at a time when the arrival of the Great Central Railway terminus at Marylebone station and its adjacent fashionable hotel was altering the desirability of the neighbourhood. Lord Portman proposed the construction of middle class 'mansion flats' on land next to the new church, the flats to be leased from the Portman Estate. The new St Cyprian's was completed with almost a year to spare under the agreement, and was dedicated to the Glory of God and the memory of Charles Gutch by the new Bishop of London, Arthur Winnington-Ingram.

When consecrated in 1904 the church interior was sparsely decorated for lack of funds. Although the altars were complete, the steady completion of interior decoration and fittings continued as gifts and legacies came in. Parclose screens were added and the stone font, vaulted narthex and gallery above in 1930. The decoration of the screens progressed in stages and the tester above the high altar in 1948. West doors followed as late as 1952. In 2022, the organ's decorative case in the west gallery remains incomplete, as do minor elements of carved stone ornament.

On 7 October 1940, German incendiary bombs landed on the South aisle roof. The lead was extensively melted and timbers burned. Some of the burning material fell through to the church floor but it was rapidly extinguished; an area of scorched wooden floor has been left in testament to this close escape.

Architecture
The present church was designed by the architect Ninian Comper (1864–1960) in a Perpendicular Gothic style. Commissioned in 1899, it was constructed between 1901 and 1903, the first new church completed to Comper's designs (his previous work comprised restoration and embellishment of existing buildings). 

St Cyprian's is of red brick with stone dressings and has a nave with clerestory and two aisles. There is no tower, but a small bellcote on Chagford Street. The architect's model for the design was the 'wool churches' of East Anglia, as championed at the time as a model for Anglo-Catholics by the Alcuin Club. It features large Perpendicular windows but the stained glass, also designed by Comper, is confined to the east end. The nave is modelled on the parish church of Attleborough in Norfolk.

St Cyprian's was designed to reflect Comper's emphasis on the Eucharist and the influence on him of the Oxford Movement; he said his church was to resemble "a lantern, and the altar is the flame within it". Therefore, the interior features unadorned whitened walls in the nave, to emphasise the contrasting richness of painted and gilded furnishings in the sanctuary. The sanctuary fittings include a delicate carved and painted rood screen and parclose screens around an 'English Altar' i.e. altar surrounded on three sides by hangings and a painted dossal, riddel posts with angels and a painted and gilded reredos; this was the kind of altar that the Alcuin Club favoured and Comper used in his early churches. At St Cyprian's the altar is set beneath a tester placed high up in the roof.  Above the rood screen is a suspended rood. 

The timber roof features combined hammer beam – tie-beam trusses with panelled tracery spandrels. Comper's stated aim was "to fulfil the ideal of the English Parish Church ... in the last manner of English Architecture". A stone font with gilded classical font cover dating from the 1930s greets the visitor at the West end, and demonstrates Comper's enjoyment, later in his career, of mixing classical and gothic features, a design strategy he called 'Unity by Inclusion.'

Iconography
In line with the deliberate emphasis on a plain nave leading to a richly embellished sanctuary, the iconography of the sanctuary is meticulously considered. The fact that it was closely supervised throughout by the same architect, working with a limited number of his preferred and trusted artisans and craftsman enabled a coherent scheme, in spite of the fact that its completion continued in stages over five decades.

Screens
The three screens separating the nave and aisles from the sanctuary and chapels are embellished in the lower stage arcade with fine paintings, mostly of saints, the subjects named below each painting.  

The left-hand screen leads to what was originally called the All Souls' Chapel and the screen shows Michael the Archangel (weighing souls), Noah, Abraham (holding souls) and Job on the inside;  the outside of the screen has Moses, David and Daniel. On completion of this screen's decoration, the chapel was re-dedicated as the Chapel of the Holy Name. 

The right-hand screen, separating the liturgical South aisle from the Lady Chapel comprises female saints: St Anne, St Mary Magdalene, Mary of Clopas, St Mary, the mother of James, Salome, St Agnes, St Cecilia, St Catherine of Alexandria, St Margaret of Antioch, St Margaret of Scotland, St Ursula, St Elizabeth of Hungary, and St Joan of Arc. 

The central screen below the rood and its attendant narrow choir gallery was completed in stages up to 1938 and the figures in the bottom stage, also all named, are: St Mary Magdalen, St John the Baptist, St John the Evangelist, St Andrew, St Peter, St Michael, St Gabriel, St Mary the Virgin, St George, St Paul, St James the Great, St James the Less, St Clement, and St Faith.

Windows and other elements

Windows
The central window over the altar 
The Lady Chapel window shows the Annunciation of the Angel to Mary, flanked by St Margaret of Scotland and St %C3%86thelthryth.

Tester
The gilded square tester suspended high over the high altar was completed in 1948. Surrounded by prayers and sacred monograms the central figure shows Christ holding an open book. The inscription, in Greek, reads "I am the Light of the World".

Font cover
The classical cover for the baptismal font dates from 1930, reflecting Comper's later interest in a broader synthesis of styles.

Reception
St Cyprian's is regarded as one of London's most beautiful church interiors. 

Writing a year after its consecration, and in spite of the still incomplete decoration of the interior, T. Francis Bumpus wrote "Mr. Comper's researches into the history of our old English Uses have enabled him ... to produce one of the most beautiful, harmonious and correctly arranged churches that has been built in London for a long time."  Peter Anson held that "It was the opening of St Cyprian's ... that finally established the reputation of the architect... There were no fixed seats only chairs, which during the week were removed, so that most of the polished parquet flooring was left bare. Nobody had ever seen anything like St Cyprians."  (The practice of removing chairs from the nave, with worshippers bringing one from the stacks at the back if they needed, was continued until the 1950s.)

Later, after most of the interior fittings were complete, John Betjeman persuaded the proprietor and editor of the Architectural Review to visit in 1938. The owner was at the time a leading advocate of Modernism in architecture but wrote to Betjeman "To our surprise — to our inexpressible surprise — we discovered it was absolutely lovely. ... indubitably the work of an architect with a remarkable feeling of space and clarity of planning...I confess I was much astonished ... You have scored again, brother."  In 1947, Betjeman was still championing Comper's work and wrote to Arthur Bryant "When in London do make a special journey to Comper's superb church (1899) of St Cyprian's, Baker Street. It is a red building near Clarence Gate, Regent's Park ... not much outside, but a Norfolk dream of gold and light within." On a later visit to the church with Simon Jenkins, Betjemin exclaimed "Ah Norfolk, Norfolk in Baker Street".

Architectural journalist Ian Nairn was another advocate for St Cyprian's: "Quiet and reserved outside; but the most joyful church interior in London. Tall white arcades, clear glass to let the light stream in across the polished wood floor, uncluttered by pews to Comper's lacy gilded rood screen. Religion singing and dancing ...". Elsewhere he described the church as "a sunburst of white and gold and all-embracing love… the moment you go in through the door you know that everything is absolutely right". Nairn called the church Comper's "soaring lark-cry".

Nikolaus Pevsner saw late Gothic-revival architecture as old-fashioned and generally gave it little credit; but he praised Comper's work at St Cyprian's, albeit a little grudgingly: "If there must be medieval imitation in the twentieth century, it is here unquestionably done with joy and care."  Comper was hailed in the mid twentieth century by Peter Hammond, a key advocate of the liturgical movement in architecture who favoured modernist architecture. Hammond praised Comper's liturgical emphasis on the altar and (secondarily) font, seeing that Comper had "realised that the real questions at issue were theological and liturgical rather than stylistic and aesthetic".

Anthony Symondson wrote that St Cyprian's established Comper's "primacy as the most influential English church architect of his generation. A simple red brick exterior gives no impression of the beauty and surprise of the interior. It is a fusion of controlled austerity and splendour."

See also
 London Shostakovich Orchestra
 St Cyprian's Cathedral, Kimberley

References

External links

1903 in London
20th-century Church of England church buildings
Clarence Gate
Clarence Gate
Churches completed in 1903
Gothic Revival church buildings in London
Grade II* listed churches in the City of Westminster
Music venues in London